Natalia Litvinova (Gomel, Belarus, 1986) is an Argentinian writer and editor of Belarusian origins, working in the fields of poetry and translation.

Life and Writing 

Litvinova was born in Gomel, Belarus, in 1986. In the 1990s, when she was about to turn 10 years old, her family decided to immigrate to Buenos Aires.
She began writing poems inspired by the poetry of Federico Garcia Lorca and the oral tradition, including elements such as stories, jokes, and songs. At twenty years old, she attended a workshop led by the Argentinian poet Javier Galarza. There she put together her first poetry collection, in which she describes certain events that happened in her childhood.

Litvinova has published 10 books of poetry written in Spanish to date. When she creates her work, Litvinova is inspired by authors who write about the experience of war and exile from different perspectives, as she herself identifies with these themes. Her most recent book is Soñka, manos de oro, published in 2022 by Spanish publisher La Bella Varsovia.

As of 2022, Litvinova is represented by Aevitas Creative Management (agent: Maria Cardona Serra) and is working on her debut novel.

Career 
In 2016, together with Tom Maver, she founded the publishing house Editorial Llantén, which is located in Buenos Aires and specializes in Russian poetry translation, both classical and contemporary. Litvinova has compiled and translated various anthologies of Russian poets of the Silver Age, such as Innokenty Annensky, Sergei Yesenin, and Marina Tsvetaeva, among others. As a translator from Russian into Spanish, she maintains a blog called Animales en bruto.

She has led creative writing workshops and courses at the Fundación Centro Psicoanalítico Argentino, directs the translation collection at Melón editora and coordinates the section deicated to Argentine letters at Revista Ombligo review. She represented Argentina at the 2015 International Poetry Festival of Granada (Nicaragua) en 2015.

Translation into Other Languages 
Litvinova's poetry has been published in Germany, France, Spain, Chile, Brazil, Colombia and the United States. Her poetry has been translated into French and published by the French publishing house Al Manar. Some of her poems have been translated into English by Kelsi Vanada and published in literary journals such as Columbia Journal and The Southern Review. She was a featured poet at the virtual PEN America Women in Translation Month reading series in 2021.

Honors and awards 
In 2017, she was awarded the "Premio estímulo" prize from the Argentine Foundation for Poetry.

Works

Poetry Collections 

 2010 - Esteparia. Ediciones del Dock. Republished in Spain and Uruguay.
 2012 - Balbuceo de la noche. Melón editora. ISBN 987283471-7
 2012 - Grieta. Gog y Magog. Republished in Spain and Costa Rica. ISBN 978-84-16149-09-4
 2013 - Rocío Animal. La Pulga Renga.
 2013 - Todo ajeno. Vaso roto. ISBN 978-84-15168-71-3
 2014 - Cuerpos textualizados. Letra viva. Written with coauthor Javier Galarza
 2015 - Siguiente vitalidad. Audisea. Republished in Spain (by La Bella Varsovia, in 2016), Mexico, and Chile
 2018 - Cesto de trenzas. La Bella Varsovia. ISBN 978-84-946544-8-0. Republished in Argentina by Editorial Llantén, 2019
 2020 - La nostalgia es un sello ardiente. Editorial Llantén. Republished in Spain (by La Bella Varsovia, in 2020) ISBN 978-987-863-981-9
 2022 - Soñka, manos de oro. Editorial Llantén

Anthologies 

 Jardín, cien poemas sobre flores, de cien poetas argentinxs. Proyecto Camalote.
 2017 - Antología premio estímulo 2017. Vinciguerra. ISBN 978-987750175-9

References 

Belarusian poets
Argentine women poets
Spanish-language writers
Translators

1986 births
Living people